O Salvador da Pátria (The Savior of the Homeland in English) is a Brazilian telenovela produced and broadcast by TV Globo. It premiered on 9 January and ended on 12 August 1989, with a total of 185 episodes. It's the fortieth "novela das oito" to be aired on the timeslot. It is created by Lauro César Muniz and directed by Gonzaga Blota.

Cast

Reception 
The show recorded an average viewership rating of 63 points, one of Brazil's top rated telenovelas of all time.

References

External links 
 

TV Globo telenovelas
1989 telenovelas
Brazilian telenovelas
1989 Brazilian television series debuts
1989 Brazilian television series endings
Television shows set in São Paulo
Portuguese-language telenovelas
Works about organized crime in Brazil